Tegeticula tambasi is a moth of the family Prodoxidae. It is found in Mexico from northern central San Luis Potosí south-east to Querétaro, and south-westward beyond Morelia, Michoacán.

The wingspan is 20–24 mm for males and 26-27.5 mm for females. The forewings are white with a narrow band of dark brown scales. The hindwings are dark brownish grey or light brownish grey. Adults are on wing from late May to mid-August.

The larvae feed on Yucca filifera.

Etymology
The species epithet is derived from tambasi, the Purépecha language name for the sole known host in the region of the type locality.

References

Moths described in 2008
Prodoxidae